Tim English (born 10 August 1997) is a professional Australian rules footballer playing for the Western Bulldogs in the Australian Football League (AFL). He was drafted by the Western Bulldogs with their first selection and nineteenth overall in the 2016 national draft. He made his debut in the forty point win against  at Etihad Stadium in round ten of the 2017 season. English went to school at Perth’s Christ Church Grammar School where he was Boarding Captain.

Statistics
Statistics are correct to the end of round 6, 2022

|- style="background-color: #EAEAEA"
! scope="row" style="text-align:center" | 2017
|
| 44 || 2 || 0 || 0 || 1 || 13 || 14 || 2 || 6 || 11 || 0.0 || 0.0 || 0.5 || 6.5 || 7.0 || 1.0 || 3.0 || 5.5 || 0
|- 
! scope="row" style="text-align:center" | 2018
|
| 44 || 7 || 1 || 2 || 49 || 42 || 91 || 33 || 11 || 97 || 0.1 || 0.3 || 7.0 || 6.0 || 13.0 || 4.7 || 1.6 || 13.9 || 0
|- style="background-color: #EAEAEA"
! scope="row" style="text-align:center" | 2019
|
| 44 || 20 || 8 || 10 || 135 || 129 || 264 || 81 || 68 || 382 || 0.4 || 0.5 || 6.8 || 6.5 || 13.2 || 4.1 || 3.4 || 19.1 || 1
|- 
! scope="row" style="text-align:center" | 2020
|
| 44 || 18 || 8 || 11 || 129 || 113 || 242 || 77 || 39 || 287 || 0.4 || 0.6 || 7.2 || 6.3 || 13.4 || 4.3 || 2.2 || 15.9 || 4
|- style="background-color: #EAEAEA"
! scope="row" style="text-align:center" | 2021
|
| 44 || 22 || 19 || 15 || 164 || 126 || 290 || 103 || 63 || 341 || 0.9 || 0.7 || 7.5 || 5.7 || 13.2 || 4.7 || 2.9 || 15.5 || 3
|-
! scope="row" style="text-align:center" | 2022
| 
| 44 || 5 || 3 || 4 || 66 || 44 || 110 || 35 || 11 || 110 || 0.6 || 0.8 || 13.2 || 8.8 || 22.0 || 7.0 || 2.2 || 22.0 || TBA
|- 
|- class="sortbottom" 
! colspan=3| Career
! 74
! 39
! 42
! 544
! 467
! 1011
! 331
! 198
! 1228
! 0.5
! 0.6
! 7.4
! 6.3
! 13.7
! 4.5
! 2.7
! 16.6
! 8
|}

Notes

References

External links

1997 births
Living people
Western Bulldogs players
South Fremantle Football Club players
Australian rules footballers from Western Australia